Rui Filipe Santos Neta (born 21 February 1997 in Póvoa de Varzim) is a Portuguese footballer who plays for C.D. Cerveira as a midfielder.

Club career
On 6 August 2016, Neta made his professional debut with Varzim in a 2016–17 LigaPro match against Gil Vicente.

References

External links

Stats and profile at LPFP 
Rui Neta at ZeroZero

1997 births
Living people
People from Póvoa de Varzim
Portuguese footballers
Association football forwards
Liga Portugal 2 players
Segunda Divisão players
Varzim S.C. players
S.C. Salgueiros players
Sportspeople from Porto District